Ángel Camarillo (born 11 March 1959) is a Spanish former professional racing cyclist. He rode in two editions of the Tour de France, six editions of the Giro d'Italia and ten editions of the Vuelta a España.

References

External links

1959 births
Living people
Spanish male cyclists
Cyclists from Madrid